Mario van Baarle (born 24 October 1965 in Pijnacker) is a track cyclist from the Netherlands. He competed in the men's team pursuit at the 1988 Summer Olympics, finishing 12th.

See also
 List of Dutch Olympic cyclists

References

1965 births
Dutch male cyclists
Olympic cyclists of the Netherlands
Cyclists at the 1988 Summer Olympics
People from Pijnacker-Nootdorp
Living people
Cyclists from South Holland